Ministry of Planning and International Cooperation (Arabic: وزارة التخطيط والتعاون الدولي  ) is a cabinet ministry of Yemen.

List of ministers 

 Waed Abdullah Badhib (17 December 2020)
 Mohamed al-Maytami ( 2014)

See also 

 Politics of Yemen

References 

Government ministries of Yemen